Events from the year 1953 in art.

Events
 November – New building for Yale University Art Gallery, New Haven, Connecticut, the first major commission for Louis Kahn, opens.
 Anthony Blunt's Art and Architecture in France 1500–1700 is published.
 Yves Klein becomes a master at judo, receiving the rank of yodan (4th dan/degree black-belt) from the Kodokan in Japan.

Awards
 Archibald Prize: Ivor Hele – Sir Henry Simpson Newland, CBE, DSO, MS, FRCS

Works

 Hans Arp – Cloud Shepherd (sculpture, University City of Caracas)
 Francis Bacon
 Study after Velázquez's Portrait of Pope Innocent X
 Two Figures (1953)
 John Brack
 Men's Wear
 The New House
 Alexander Calder – Acoustic Clouds (installation, University City of Caracas)
 José Manuel Capuletti - Dama en la Playa
 Edwin Dickinson – Ruin at Daphne (begun 1943; Metropolitan Museum of Art)
 Dong Xiwen – The Founding Ceremony of the Nation (original version)
 Jacob Epstein – Social Consciousness (sculpture group, Philadelphia)
 M. C. Escher – Relativity (lithograph)
 Barbara Hepworth – Hieroglyph (sculpture)
 Edward Hopper – Office in a Small City (Metropolitan Museum of Art)
 Willem de Kooning – Woman III
 L. S. Lowry
 Football Ground
 Industrial Landscape
 The Procession passing the Queen Victoria Memorial, Coronation
 René Magritte – Golconda
 Marino Marini – Horse and Rider (bronze)
 Henri Matisse – The Snail (colored paper collage)
 Roberto Matta – Cercle du Blé (Circle of Wheat) (Museum of Fine Arts, Boston)
 Milton Menasco –  'La Troienne' and Her Foals: Eighteen Vignettes and One Painting Together in One Frame for John Whitney
 Henry Moore – Draped Reclining Figure (bronze)
 Alexander Phimister Proctor – John McLoughlin (bronze)
 Jackson Pollock – Portrait and a Dream
 Larry Rivers – Washington Crossing the Delaware
 Mark Rothko – No. 61 (Rust and Blue)
 Alexander Nikolayevich Samokhvalov – In the Sun
 Charles Sheeler – Ore Into Iron (Museum of Fine Arts, Boston)

Exhibitions
 October – Robert Rauschenberg's White Paintings are exhibited at Eleanor Ward's Stable Gallery in New York City.

Births
 January 7 – Robert Longo, American painter and sculptor
 January 9 – Javad Alizadeh, Iranian cartoonist and painter
 February 25 – Martin Kippenberger, German artist (d. 1997)
 April 24 – Eric Bogosian, American performance artist
 May 18 – Helen Chadwick, English conceptual artist (d. 1996)
 September 12 – Stephen Sprouse, American fashion designer and artist (d. 2004)
 Full date unknown
 Michael Kenna, English landscape photographer
 Kevin O'Neill, English comic book illustrator
 Marjetica Potrč, Slovenian artist and architect

Deaths
 February 1 – Archibald Nicoll, New Zealand painter (b. 1886)
 February 12 – Uroš Predić, Serbian Realist painter (b. 1857)
 March 23 – Raoul Dufy, French Fauvist painter (b. 1877)
 March 26 – Đorđe Jovanović, Serbian sculptor (b. 1861)
 April 15 – Charles R. Knight, American animal painter (b. 1874)
 April 29
 Moïse Kisling, Polish-born painter (b. 1891)
 Alice Prin ("Kiki de Montparnasse"), French artist, model and entertainer (b. 1901)
 June 23 – Albert Gleizes, French painter (b. 1881)
 September 13 – Mary Brewster Hazelton, American portrait painter (b. 1868)
 September 26 – Xu Beihong, Chinese painter (b. 1895)
 October 2 – John Marin, American modernist painter (b. 1870)
 October 6 – Vera Mukhina, Latvian-born Soviet sculptor (b. 1889)
 October 11 – James Earle Fraser, American sculptor (b. 1876)
 October 21 – Sir Muirhead Bone, British etcher (b. 1876)
 November 30 – Francis Picabia, French painter and poet (b. 1879)
 date unknown – J. Laurie Wallace, Irish American painter (b.1864)

See also
 1953 in fine arts of the Soviet Union

References

 
Years of the 20th century in art
1950s in art